The 1993 Croatian Football Super Cup was the second edition of the Croatian Football Super Cup, a two-legged affair contested between 1992–93 Croatian First League winners Croatia Zagreb and 1992–93 Croatian Football Cup winners Hajduk Split.

The first leg was played at Stadion Maksimir in Zagreb on 1 August 1993, while the second leg on 7 August 1993 at Stadion Poljud in Split.

First leg

Second leg

References 
 1993 Croatian Football Super Cup at HRnogomet.com

1993
GNK Dinamo Zagreb matches
HNK Hajduk Split matches
Supercup